Goliath is a steel roller coaster at La Ronde located in Montreal, Quebec, Canada. Construction commenced in September 2005, and the roller coaster opened to the public on May 13, 2006. Goliath was the tallest and fastest roller coaster in Canada until it was surpassed by Behemoth (another Bolliger & Mabillard roller coaster), at Canada's Wonderland's in 2008. Six Flags announced that Goliath would be hooked up with Virtual Reality for a New Revolution experience for the 2016 season, which was previously made as a world premiere in 2013 by a Montreal VR company.

History
Speculation that La Ronde would be building a new roller coaster began in the second half of 2004. Rumors that the roller coaster would be manufactured by Bolliger & Mabillard emerged in September 2005. Construction for the roller coaster by Martin & Vleminckx began in September 2005 with land clearing and foundation pouring. The $18.7 million Goliath was announced on October 26, 2005. By mid-November, the storage bay was constructed with track pieces for the brake run and station being installed soon after. Construction on the lift hill continued throughout December and was topped off (the highest piece the lift hill) on December 21. The first drop was completed by mid-January 2006 followed by the first camelback hill which was completed by the end of February. After the second and third camelback hills were installed, the turnaround was completed in mid-March. The three camelback hills and banked turns leading back to the station were installed by the end of March marking the completion of installing track. The trains were also delivered in late March. After the cars were put on the track in April, testing began.  Once testing was complete, Goliath opened to the public on May 13, 2006.

When Goliath opened, it was the tallest and fastest roller coaster in Canada. Two years later, when Behemoth opened at Canada's Wonderland, Goliath lost both records.

Ride experience
After being dispatched from the station, the train immediately begins to climb the  lift hill. Once at the top, the train drops back down  at a 70-degree angle. Following the third hill, the train enters a  left hand turnaround that makes the train face the opposite direction that it came. Then, the train makes an upward  right banked turn, immediately followed by a downward left banked turn. After another  left banked turn, the train rises back up and goes over a small bump before entering the final brake run. The train then makes a 180-degree right turn leading back to the station. One cycle of the ride lasts about three minutes.

Characteristics

Track
It is made up of 150 foundations, 300 pilings, 106 supports and 850 anchor bolts. The roller coasters has no inversions, though it does feature seven camelback hills. The track is painted red with yellow rails, while the supports are painted blue. It was manufactured by Clermont Steel Fabricators located in Batavia, Ohio.

Though Goliath is a B&M Hyper Coaster (the model name for this type of B&M roller coaster), the roller coaster is technically not classified as a Hypercoaster.

Trains
Goliath operates with two steel and fiberglass trains. Each train has nine cars which can seat four riders in a single row, for a total of 36 riders per train; each seat has its own individual lap-bar restraint. The structure of the trains are colored yellow, red and blue. The seats are blue and the restraints are yellow.

Awards

In Goliath's opening year, it was voted the 37th best steel roller coaster in Amusement Today's Golden Ticket Awards. The roller coaster peaked at position 23 in 2011. It did not place in the top five new roller coasters for 2006.

References

External links

Official website

La Ronde (amusement park)
Roller coasters manufactured by Bolliger & Mabillard
Roller coasters operated by Six Flags
Roller coasters in Quebec
Roller coasters introduced in 2006
Hypercoasters manufactured by Bolliger & Mabillard